This is a list of butterfly species found in the Kerala, India.

Family: Papilionidae

Subfamily: Papilioninae

Genus: Graphium (swordtails, bluebottles and jays)

Graphium agamemnon (tailed jay)

Graphium antiphates (fivebar swordtail)

Graphium doson (common jay)

Graphium nomius (spot swordtail)

Graphium teredon (southern / narrow-banded bluebottle)

Genus: Pachliopta (red-bodied swallowtail, roses)

Pachliopta aristolochiae (common rose)

Pachliopta hector (crimson rose)

Pachliopta pandiyana (Malabar rose)

Genus: Papilio (swallowtails, mimes)

Papilio buddha (Malabar banded peacock)

Papilio clytia (common mime)

Papilio crino (common banded peacock)

Papilio demoleus (lime butterfly)

Papilio dravidarum (Malabar raven)

Papilio helenus (red Helen)

Papilio liomedon (Malabar banded swallowtail)

Papilio paris (Paris peacock)

Papilio polymnestor (blue Mormon)

Papilio polytes (common Mormon)

Genus: Troides (birdwings)

Troides minos (southern birdwing)

Family: Pieridae

Subfamily: Coliadinae (yellows)

Genus: Catopsilia (emigrants)

Catopsilia pomona (common emigrant)

Catopsilia pyranthe (mottled emigrant)

Genus: Colias (clouded yellows)

Colias nilagiriensis (Nilgiri clouded yellow)

Genus: Eurema (grass yellows)

Eurema andersonii (one-spot grass yellow)

Eurema blanda (three-spot grass yellow)

Eurema brigitta (small grass yellow)

Eurema hecabe (common grass yellow)

Eurema laeta (spotless grass yellow)

Eurema nilgiriensis (Nilgiri grass yellow)

Subfamily: Pierinae (whites)

Genus: Appias (puffins and albatrosses)

Appias albina (common albatross)

Appias indra (plain puffin)

Appias lalage (spot puffin)

Appias libythea (striped albatross)

Appias lyncida (chocolate albatross)

Appias wardii (Indian / Ward's albatross)

Genus: Belenois (pioneers)

Belenois aurota (pioneer)

Genus: Cepora (gulls)

Cepora nadina (lesser gull)

Cepora nerissa (common gull)

Genus: Colotis (Arabs)

Colotis amata (small salmon Arab)

Colotis aurora (plain orange-tip)

Colotis danae (crimson-tip)

Colotis etrida (little orange-tip)

Colotis fausta (large salmon Arab)

Genus: Delias (Jezebels)

Delias eucharis (common Jezebel)

Genus: Hebomoia (great orange tips)

Hebomoia glaucippe (great orange tip)

Genus: Ixias (Indian orange tips)

Ixias marianne (white orange tip)

Ixias pyrene (yellow orange tip)

Genus: Leptosia (Psyche)

Leptosia nina (Psyche)

Genus: Pareronia (wanderers)

Pareronia ceylanica (dark wanderer)

Pareronia hippia (common wanderer)

Genus: Pieris (whites)

Pieris canidia (Indian cabbage white)

Genus: Prioneris (sawtooths)

Prioneris sita (painted sawtooth)

Family: Nymphalidae

Subfamily: Apaturinae

Genus: Euripus (courtesans)

Euripus consimilis (painted courtesan)

Genus: Rohana (princes)

Rohana parisatis (black prince)

Subfamily: Biblidinae

Genus: Ariadne (castors)

Ariadne ariadne (angled castor)

Ariadne merione (common castor)

Genus: Byblia (jokers)

Byblia ilithyia (joker)

Subfamily: Charaxinae

Genus: Charaxes (rajahs and nawabs)

Charaxes agrarius (anomalous nawab)

Charaxes athamas/bharata (common/Indian nawab)

Charaxes psaphon (plain tawny rajah)

Charaxes schreiber (blue nawab)

Charaxes solon (black rajah)

Subfamily: Cyrestinae

Genus: Cyrestis (maps)

Cyrestis thyodamas (common map)

Subfamily: Danainae

Genus: Danaus (tigers)

Danaus chrysippus (plain tiger)

Danaus genutia (common/striped tiger)

Genus: Euploea (crows)

Euploea core (common crow)

Euploea klugii (king crow)

Euploea sylvester (double-branded crow)

Genus: Idea (tree nymphs)

Idea malabarica (Malabar tree nymph)

Genus: Parantica (glassy tigers)

Parantica aglea (glassy tiger)

Parantica nilgiriensis (Nilgiri tiger)

Genus: Tirumala (blue tigers)

Tirumala limniace (blue tiger)

Tirumala septentrionis (dark blue tiger)

Subfamily: Heliconiinae

Genus: Acraea (costers)

Acraea terpsicore/violae (tawny coster)

Genus: Argynnis (fritillaries)

Argynnis hyperbius (Indian fritillary)

Genus: Cethosia (lacewings)

Cethosia nietneri mahratta (Tamil lacewing)

Genus: Cirrochroa (yeomen)

Cirrochroa thais (Tamil yeoman)

Genus: Cupha (rustics)

Cupha erymanthis (rustic)

Genus: Phalanta (leopards)

Phalanta alcippe (small leopard)

Phalanta phalantha (common leopard)

Genus: Vindula (cruisers)

Vindula erota (cruiser)

Subfamily: Libytheinae

Genus: Libythea (beaks)

Libythea laius (lobed beak)

Libythea myrrha (club beak)

Subfamily: Limenitidinae

Genus: Athyma (sergeants)

Athyma nefte inara (colour sergeant)

Athyma perius (common sergeant)

Athyma ranga (blackvein sergeant)

Athyma selenophora (staff sergeant)

Genus: Dophla (dukes)

Dophla evelina (red-spot duke)

Genus: Euthalia (barons)

Euthalia aconthea (common baron)

Euthalia lubentina (gaudy baron)

Euthalia nais/Symphaedra nais (baronet)

Euthalia telchinia (blue baron)

Genus: Moduza (commanders)

Moduza procris (commander)

Genus: Neptis (sailers)

Neptis clinia (clear sailer)

Neptis/Phaedyma columella (shortbanded sailer)

Neptis hylas (common sailer)

Neptis jumbah (chestnut-streaked sailer)

Neptis nata (sullied sailer)

Neptis soma (creamy sailer)

Neptis/Lasippa viraja (yellowjack sailer)

Genus: Pantoporia (lascars)

Pantoporia hordonia (common lascar)

Pantoporia sandaka (extra lascar)

Genus: Parthenos (clippers)

Parthenos sylvia (clipper)

Genus: Tanaecia (counts)

Tanaecia lepidea (grey count)

Subfamily: Nymphalinae

Genus: Doleschallia (autumn leaves)

Doleschallia bisaltide (autumn leaf)

Genus: Hypolimnas (eggflies)

Hypolimnas bolina (great eggfly)

Hypolimnas misippus (Danaid eggfly)

Genus: Junonia (pansies)

Junonia almana (peacock pansy)

Junonia atlites (grey pansy)

Junonia hierta (yellow pansy)

Junonia iphita (chocolate pansy)

Junonia lemonias (lemon pansy)

Junonia orithya (blue pansy)

Genus: Kallima (oakleaves)

Kallima horsfieldii (South-Indian/Sahyadri blue oakleaf)

Genus: Kaniska

Kaniska canace (blue admiral)

Genus: Vanessa (admirals, ladies)

Vanessa cardui (painted lady)

Vanessa indica (Indian red admiral)

Subfamily: Satyrinae

Genus: Amathusia (palmkings)

Amathusia phidippus (palmking)

Genus: Discophora (duffers)

Discophora lepida (southern duffer)

Genus: Elymnias (palmflies)

Elymnias caudata (tailed palmfly)

Genus: Heteropsis

Heteropsis/Telinga adolphei (redeye bushbrown)

Heteropsis/Telinga davisoni (Palni bushbrown)

Genus: Lethe (treebrowns)

Lethe drypetis (Tamil treebrown)

Lethe europa (bamboo treebrown)

Lethe rohria (common treebrown)

Genus: Melanitis (evening browns)

Melanitis leda (common evening brown)

Melanitis phedima (dark evening brown)

Melanitis zitenius (great evening brown)

Genus: Mycalesis (bushbrowns)

Mycalesis anaxias (whitebar bushbrown)

Mycalesis igilia (small longbrand bushbrown)

Mycalesis mineus (dark branded bushbrown)

Mycalesis/Telinga oculus (red-disc bushbrown)

Mycalesis orcha (pale-brand bushbrown)

Mycalesis patnia junonia (glad-eye bushbrown)

Mycalesis perseus (common bushbrown)

Mycalesis subdita (Tamil bushbrown)

Mycalesis visala (long-brand bushbrown)

Genus: Orsotriaena

Orsotriaena medus (dark grass-brown / smooth-eyed bushbrown)

Genus: Parantirrhoea

Parantirrhoea marshalli (Travancore evening brown)

Genus: Ypthima (rings)

Ypthima asterope (common threering)

Ypthima baldus (common fivering)

Ypthima ceylonica (white fourring)

Ypthima chenu (Nilgiri fourring)

Ypthima huebneri (common fourring)

Ypthima singala (Sinhalese fivering)

Ypthima striata (Nilgiri jewel fourring)

Ypthima philomela/tabella (baby fivering)

Ypthima ypthimoides (Palni fourring)

Genus: Zipaetis (catseyes)

Zipaetis saitis (Tamil catseye)

Family: Riodinidae

Subfamily: Nemeobiinae

Genus: Abisara (Judies)

Abisara bifasciata (double-banded Judy)

Abisara echerius (plum Judy)

Family: Lycaenidae

Subfamily: Curetinae

Genus: Curetis (sunbeams)

Curetis acuta (angled sunbeam)

Curetis siva (Shiva sunbeam)

Curetis thetis (Indian sunbeam)

Subfamily: Miletinae

Genus: Spalgis (apeflies)

Spalgis epius (apefly)

Subfamily: Polyommatinae

Genus: Acytolepis (hedge blues)

Acytolepis lilacea (Hampson's hedge blue)

Acytolepis puspa (common hedge blue)

Genus: Anthene (ciliate blues)

Anthene emolus (ciliate blue)

Anthene lycaenina (pointed ciliate blue)

Genus: Azanus (babul blues)

Azanus jesous (African babul blue)

Azanus ubaldus (bright babul blue)

Azanus uranus (dull babul blue)

Genus: Caleta

Caleta decidia (angled Pierrot)

Genus: Castalius

Castalius rosimon (common Pierrot)

Genus: Catochrysops

Catochrysops panormus (silver forget-me-not)

Catochrysops strabo (forget-me-not)

Genus: Celastrina

Celastrina lavendularis (plain hedge blue)

Genus: Celatoxia

Celatoxia albidisca (white-disc hedge blue)

Genus: Chilades

Chilades lajus (lime blue)

Chilades parrhasius (small cupid)

Genus: Discolampa

Discolampa ethion (banded blue Pierrot)

Genus: Euchrysops

Euchrysops cnejus (gram blue)

Genus: Everes

Everes lacturnus (Indian cupid)

Genus: Freyeria

Freyeria putli (small grass jewel)

Freyeria trochylus (grass jewel)

Genus: Ionolyce

Ionolyce helicon (pointed lineblue)

Genus: Jamides (ceruleans)

Jamides alecto (metallic cerulean)

Jamides bochus (dark cerulean)

Jamides celeno (common cerulean)

Genus: Lampides

Lampides boeticus (peablue)

Genus: Leptotes

Leptotes plinius (zebra blue)

Genus: Luthrodes

Luthrodes pandava (plains cupid)

Genus: Megisba

Megisba malaya (Malayan)

Genus: Nacaduba

Nacaduba beroe (opaque six-line blue)

Nacaduba berenice (rounded six-line blue)

Nacaduba calauria (dark Ceylon six-line blue)

Nacaduba hermus (pale four-line blue)

Nacaduba kurava (transparent six-line blue)

Nacaduba pactolus (large four-line blue)

Genus: Neopithecops

Neopithecops zalmora (Quaker)

Genus: Petrelaea

Petrelaea dana (dingy lineblue)

Genus: Prosotas (lineblues)

Prosotas dubiosa (tailless lineblue)

Prosotas nora (common lineblue)

Prosotas noreia (white-tipped lineblue)

Genus: Pseudozizeeria (lineblues)

Pseudozizeeria maha (pale grass blue)

Genus: Talicada

Talicada nyseus (red Pierrot)

Genus: Tarucus

Tarucus ananda (dark Pierrot)

Tarucus callinara (spotted Pierrot)

Tarucus nara (striped Pierrot)

Genus: Udara

Udara akasa (white hedge blue)

Genus: Zizeeria

Zizeeria karsandra (dark grass blue)

Genus: Zizina

Zizina otis (lesser grass blue)

Genus: Zizula

Zizula hylax (tiny grass blue)

Subfamily: Theclinae

Genus: Amblypodia

Amblypodia anita (purple leaf blue)

Genus: Ancema

Ancema blanka (silver royal)

Genus: Arhopala

Arhopala abseus (aberrant oakblue)

Arhopala alea (Kanara oakblue)

Arhopala amantes (large oakblue)

Arhopala atrax (Indian oakblue)

Arhopala bazaloides (Tamil oakblue)

Arhopala centaurus (centaur oakblue)

Genus: Bindahara

Bindahara phocides (plane)

Genus: Catapaecilma

Catapaecilma major (common tinsel)

Genus: Cheritra

Cheritra freja (common imperial)

Genus: Creon

Creon cleobis (broadtail royal)

Genus: Deudorix

Deudorix epijarbas (cornelian)

Genus: Horaga

Horaga onyx (common onyx)

Horaga viola (brown onyx)

Genus: Hypolycaena

Hypolycaena nilgirica (Nilgiri tit)

Hypolycaena othona (orchid tit)

Genus: Iraota

Iraota timoleon (silverstreak blue)

Genus: Loxura

Loxura atymnus (yamfly)

Genus: Pratapa

Pratapa deva (white royal)

Genus: Rachana

Rachana jalindra (banded royal)

Genus: Rapala

Rapala iarbus (common red flash)

Rapala lankana (Malabar flash)

Rapala manea (slate flash)

Rapala varuna (indigo flash)

Genus: Rathinda

Rathinda amor (monkey puzzle)

Genus: Surendra

Surendra vivarna biplagiata (acacia blue)

Genus: Tajuria

Tajuria cippus (peacock royal)

Tajuria jehana (plains blue royal)

Tajuria maculata (spotted royal)

Tajuria melastigma (branded royal)

Genus: Thaduka

Thaduka multicaudata (many-tailed oak-blue)

Genus: Virachola

Virachola isocrates (common guava blue)

Virachola perse (large guava blue)

Genus: Zeltus

Zeltus amasa (fluffy tit)

Genus: Zesius

Zesius chrysomallus (redspot)

Genus: Zinaspa

Zinaspa todara (silver streaked acacia blue)

Subfamily: Aphnaeinae

Genus: Cigaritis

Cigaritis abnormis (abnormal silverline)

Cigaritis elima (scarce shot silverline)

Cigaritis ictis (common shot silverline)

Cigaritis lilacinus (lilac silverline)

Cigaritis lohita (long banded silverline)

Cigaritis schistacea (plumbeous silverline)

Cigaritis vulcanus (common silverline)

Family: Hesperiidae

Subfamily: Coeliadinae

Genus: Badamia

Badamia exclamationis (brown awl)

Genus: Bibasis

Bibasis sena (orange-tailed awlet)

Genus: Burara

Burara gomata (pale green awlet)

Burara jaina (orange awlet)

Genus: Choaspes

Choaspes benjaminii (Indian awlking)

Genus: Hasora

Hasora badra (common awl)

Hasora chromus (common banded awl)

Hasora taminatus (white banded awl)

Hasora vitta (plain banded awl)

Subfamily: Hesperiinae

Genus: Aeromachus

Aeromachus dubius (dingy scrub-hopper)

Aeromachus pygmaeus (pygmy scrub-hopper)

Genus: Ampittia

Ampittia dioscorides (bush hopper)

Genus: Arnetta

Arnetta mercara (Coorg forest hopper)

Arnetta vindhiana (Vindhyan bob)

Genus: Baoris

Baoris farri (paintbrush swift)

Genus: Baracus

Baracus vittatus (hedge hopper)

Genus: Borbo

Borbo bevani (Beavan's swift)

Borbo cinnara (rice swift)

Genus: Caltoris

Caltoris canaraica (Kanara swift)

Caltoris kumara (blank swift)

Caltoris philippina (Philippine swift)

Genus: Cephrenes

Cephrenes acalle (plain palm dart)

Genus: Cupitha

Cupitha purreea (wax dart)

Genus: Erionota

Erionota torus (rounded palm-redeye)

Genus: Gangara

Gangara thyrsis (giant redeye)

Genus: Halpe

Halpe homolea (Indian ace)

Halpe porus (Moore's ace)

Genus: Hyarotis

Hyarotis adrastus (tree flitter)

Hyarotis microstictum (brush flitter)

Genus: Iambrix

Iambrix salsala (chestnut bob)

Genus: Matapa

Matapa aria (common redeye)

Genus: Notocrypta

Notocrypta curvifascia (restricted demon)

Notocrypta paralysos (common banded demon)

Genus: Oriens

Oriens concinna (Tamil dartlet)

Oriens goloides (Ceylon dartlet)

Genus: Parnara

Parnara bada (Oriental/variable swift)

Genus: Pelopidas

Pelopidas agna (dark/obscure branded swift)

Pelopidas conjuncta (conjoined swift)

Pelopidas mathias (small branded swift)

Pelopidas subochracea (large branded swift)

Genus: Polytremis

Polytremis lubricans (contiguous swift)

Genus: Potanthus

Potanthus confucius (Chinese dart)

Potanthus pallida (pallid dart)

Potanthus palnia (Palni dart)

Potanthus pava (Pava dart)

Potanthus pseudomaesa (Indian dart)

Genus: Psolos

Psolos fuligo (dusky partwing/coon)

Genus: Quedara

Quedara basiflava (golden flitter)

Genus: Salanoemia

Salanoemia sala (maculate lancer)

Genus: Sovia

Sovia hyrtacus (bicolour/white-branded ace)

Genus: Suastus

Suastus gremius (Indian palm bob)

Suastus minuta (small palm bob)

Genus: Taractrocera

Taractrocera ceramas (Tamil grass dart)

Taractrocera maevius (common grass dart)

Genus: Telicota

Telicota bambusae (dark palm dart)

Telicota colon (pale palm dart)

Genus: Thoressa

Thoressa astigmata (southern spotted ace)

Thoressa evershedi (Evershed's ace)

Thoressa honorei (Madras ace)

Thoressa sitala (Tamil ace)

Genus: Udaspes

Udaspes folus (grass demon)

Genus: Zographetus

Zographetus ogygia (purple-spotted flitter)

Subfamily: Pyrginae

Genus: Caprona

Caprona agama (spotted angle)

Caprona alida (Alida angle)

Caprona ransonnetii (golden angle)

Genus: Celaenorrhinus

Celaenorrhinus ambareesa (Malabar spotted flat)

Celaenorrhinus leucocera (common spotted flat)

Celaenorrhinus putra (restricted spotted flat)

Celaenorrhinus ruficornis fusca (Tamil spotted flat)

Genus: Coladenia

Coladenia indrani (tricolour pied flat)

Genus: Gerosis

Gerosis bhagava (common yellowbreast flat)

Genus: Gomalia

Gomalia elma (African marbled skipper)

Genus: Odontoptilum

Odontoptilum angulata (chestnut angle)

Genus: Pseudocoladenia

Pseudocoladenia dan (fulvous pied flat)

Genus: Sarangesa

Sarangesa dasahara (common small flat)

Sarangesa purendra (spotted small flat)

Genus: Spialia

Spialia galba (Indian skipper)

Genus: Tagiades

Tagiades gana (large/suffused snow flat)

Tagiades japetus (common snow flat)

Tagiades litigiosa (water snow flat)

Genus: Tapena

Tapena thwaitesi (black angle)

See also
 Butterfly
 List of butterflies of India
 List of butterflies of the Western Ghats
 Fauna of India

References

 - Family Nymphalidae
 - Families Papilionidae, Pieridae and Lycaenidae
 Vol. 17: 418-424, 921-927.
 Vol. 19: 16-58, 438-474, 635-682, 846-879, Vol. 20: 279-330, 1115-1136, Vol. 21: 517-544, 740-766, 1131-1157, Vol. 22: 92-100, 320-344, 517-531, Vol. 23: 73-103, 481-497, Vol. 24: 656-672, Vol. 25: 430-453, 636-664, Vol. 26: 98-140,438-487, 750-769, 941-954, Vol. 27: 26-32, 211-227, 431-447, 778-793, Vol: 29: 429-455, 703-717, 921-946, Vol. 30: 132-150, 285-305, 561-586, 822-837, Vol. 31: 323-351, 655-686, 951-974.

 Family: Papilionidae, Pieridae
 Family: Danaidae, Satyridae, Amathusiidae and Acraeidae

Larsen, T. B. (1987–88). "The butterflies of the Nilgiri Mountains of southern India (Lepidoptera: Rhopalocera)". Journal of the Bombay Natural History Society. 84 (3): 26-54, 291-316, 560-584 & 85 (1): 26-43.
; Part II; Part III; Part IV; Part V

External links

Butterflies of India. Indian Foundation for Butterflies. 
India Biodiversity Portal. Biodiversity Informatics Platform. 

Journal of the Lepidopterists' Society hosted at Yale

Kerala
Butterflies
K